Kōsaku, Kosaku or Kousaku (written: 功作, 宏作, 幸作, 耕作, 耕筰, 興作, 孝作 or 浩作) is a masculine Japanese given name. Notable people with the name include:

, Japanese baseball player
, Imperial Japanese Navy admiral
, Japanese archaeologist and academic
, Japanese footballer
, Japanese karateka
, Japanese sumo wrestler
Kosaku Shimada (born 1944), Japanese golfer
, Japanese poet and writer
, Japanese composer and conductor
, Japanese physician and translator
, Japanese mathematician

Japanese masculine given names